Flight 241 may refer to:
 Aerosvit Flight 241, crashed on 17 December 1997
 PMTair Flight 241, crashed on 25 June 2007
 CHC Helikopter Service Flight 241, crashed on 29 April 2016
 Air Vanuatu Flight 241, suffered an in-flight engine fire on 28 July 2018

0241